Kamyab TV is a 24-hour Odia language general entertainment TV channel. It broadcasts various regional programs related to family entertainment, current affair, discussion and news. Kamyab TV got license from Union Ministry of IB in 2009.

Kamyab TV is available in INSAT-4A satellite in MPEG-4 format. It is headquartered in Bhubaneswar. Two serials Ganga Jamuna Saraswati and Dhara Shravan are broadcast on Kamyab TV.

References

See also
List of Oriya-language television channels

Free-to-air
Mass media in Odisha
Television stations in Bhubaneswar
2009 establishments in Orissa
Television channels and stations established in 2009